Bijni College is an undergraduate college is situated on the Indo-Bhutan border, Bijni. The college is established in the year 1969 at Bijni of Chirang district in Assam. The college is affiliated to Bodoland University.

Departments

Arts
 Assamese
 Bengali
 Bodo
 English
 Education
 Economics
 History
 Political Science
 Philosophy

Science
 Botany
 Chemistry
 Mathematics
 Physics
 Zoology

Accreditation
In 2017 the college has been awarded 'B+' grade by National Assessment and Accreditation Council. The college is also recognised by University Grants Commission (India).

References

External links

Colleges affiliated to Gauhati University
Universities and colleges in Assam
1969 establishments in Assam
Educational institutions established in 1969